The White Beeches Golf and Country Club is located in Haworth, New Jersey, USA, and has 18 holes of golf. It has hosted U.S. Open sectional qualifiers, Met Open qualifiers and the State Open.

History
The course was built in 1918 and designed by Walter Travis. It plays to a par 72 from about 6,500 yards.

It hosted its second annual AJGA tournament last summer. 

The head professional is the ex-tour player, Jim McGovern, and the assistant professional is Bryan Romagnoli.

The course also overlaps the municipalities of Oradell, New Jersey, and Dumont, New Jersey. 

1915 establishments in New Jersey
Sports venues in Bergen County, New Jersey
Golf clubs and courses in New Jersey
Haworth, New Jersey